Philippe Flajolet (1 December 1948 – 22 March 2011) was a French computer scientist.

Biography
A former student of École Polytechnique, Philippe Flajolet received his PhD in computer science from University Paris Diderot in 1973 and state doctorate from Paris-Sud 11 University in 1979. Most of Philippe Flajolet's research work was dedicated towards general methods for analyzing the computational complexity of algorithms, including the theory of average-case complexity. He introduced the theory of analytic combinatorics. With Robert Sedgewick of Princeton University, he wrote the first book-length treatment of the
topic, the 2009 book entitled Analytic Combinatorics. In 1993, together with Rainer Kemp, Helmut Prodinger and Robert Sedgewick, Flajolet initiated the successful series of workshops and conferences which was key to the development of a research community around the analysis of algorithms, and which evolved into the AofA—International Meeting on Combinatorial, Probabilistic, and Asymptotic Methods in the Analysis of Algorithms.

A summary of his research up to 1998 can be found in the article "Philippe Flajolet's research in Combinatorics and Analysis of Algorithms" by H. Prodinger and W. Szpankowski, Algorithmica 22 (1998), 366–387.

At the time of his death from a serious illness, Philippe Flajolet was a research director (senior research scientist) at INRIA in Rocquencourt.

From 1994 to 2003 he was a corresponding member of the French Academy of Sciences, and was a full member from 2003 on. He was also a member of the Academia Europaea.

Memory
The HyperLogLog commands of Redis, released in April 2014, are prefixed with "PF" in honor of Philippe Flajolet. The Flajolet Lecture Prize, which has been awarded since 2014, was also named in honor of him.

Selected works
 with Robert Sedgewick: An Introduction to the Analysis of Algorithms. 2nd edition, Addison-Wesley, Boston, Mass. 1995, 
 with Robert Sedgewick: Analytic Combinatorics. Cambridge University Press, Cambridge 2009,  
 Random tree models in the analysis of algorithms. INRIA, Rocquencourt 1987 (Rapports de recherche; Vol. 729)
 with Andrew Odlyzko: Singularity analysis of generating functions. University Press, Stanford, Calif. 1988

References

External links 
 Philippe Flajolet's Home Page
 Philippe Flajolet and Analytic Combinatorics, Conference in the memory of Philippe Flajolet
 Luc Devroye, Philippe Flajolet, 1 December 1948 – 22 March 2011
 Philippe Flajolet: Philippe Flajolet, On-Line Encyclopedia of Integer Sequences

1948 births
2011 deaths
École Polytechnique alumni
French computer scientists
Members of the French Academy of Sciences
Members of Academia Europaea
20th-century French mathematicians
21st-century French mathematicians
Graph theorists
Number theorists